Geoffrey Edwin Acheampong (born January 28, 1997) is a Ghanaian professional footballer who currently plays for RoPS in the Finnish Ykkönen.

Early life and education 
Acheampong was born in Sunyani, Ghana, on January 28, 1997, to Alice and Henry Acheampong. He was a part of the Right to Dream Academy and would ultimately move to the United States. He played high school soccer at Cate School in Carpinteria, California, and made worldwide headlines with a goal scored from a distance of 60 yards.

A highly touted prep, Acheampong was rated as the 24th best collegiate soccer prospect in the class of 2015. He continued his soccer career and announced his intention to enroll at the University of California, Santa Barbara. In his only year with the Gauchos, Acheampong made 22 appearances and scored 3 goals. Playing alongside Nick DePuy, the 10 assists he recorded were the highest on the team. The Big West Conference announced Acheampong as the 2015 Freshman of the Year. Despite having played only one year, he was already being highly considered as a top Major League Soccer prospect. He left school after his first season with the Gauchos to pursue a professional soccer career.

Professional career 
In June 2016, it was announced that Acheampong had signed with SC Bastia of Ligue 1. On September 18, 2016, Acheampong made his professional debut upon entering as a substitute for Allan Saint-Maximin in a match against AS Saint-Étienne.

Acheampong signed with Veracruz for the 2017–18 Liga MX season.

On March 1, 2018, it was announced that Acheampong had signed with LA Galaxy II.

In June 2020, Acheampong moved to Finnish Ykkönen side AC Kajaani. He made his debut for Kajaani on 27 June 2020 against FF Jaro, where he scored both goals in a 2–2 draw.

In March 2021, Acheampong signed with Ghana Premier League side Elmina Sharks as a free agent.

In July 2021, Acheampong returned to Finland for Veikkausliiga club Rovaniemen Palloseura.

Awards and honors 
Individual
 Big West Conference Freshman of the Year: 2015
Vuoden jalkapalloälykkö: 2021

References

External links 
 Geoffrey Acheampong at LA Galaxy
 
 
 Geoffrey Acheampong at USL Championship
 Geoffrey Acheampong at UC Santa Barbara Gauchos

1997 births
Living people
Association football midfielders
Ghanaian footballers
Ghanaian expatriate footballers
UC Santa Barbara Gauchos men's soccer players
SC Bastia players
Ligue 1 players
Expatriate footballers in France
People from Sunyani District
LA Galaxy II players
USL Championship players
AC Kajaani players
Expatriate footballers in Finland
Elmina Sharks F.C. players
Rovaniemen Palloseura players